Steven Paul Jenkins (born 30 May 1978) is an English cricketer.  Jenkins is a right-handed batsman who plays primarily as a wicketkeeper.  He was born at Taunton, Somerset.

Jenkins represented the Somerset Cricket Board in 2 List A matches against Bedfordshire in the 2nd round of the 1999 NatWest Trophy and Staffordshire in the 1st round of the 2000 NatWest Trophy.  In his 2 List A matches, he scored 58 runs at a batting average of 29.00, with a high score of 42.

He currently plays club cricket for Taunton St Andrews Cricket Club in the West of England Premier League.

References

External links
Steven Jenkins at Cricinfo
Steven Jenkins at CricketArchive

1978 births
Living people
Sportspeople from Taunton
Cricketers from Somerset
English cricketers
Somerset Cricket Board cricketers
James Beard Foundation Award winners
Wicket-keepers